Mazippa was the leader of the Moors, a Berber tribe of Roman North Africa during the Gaetulian Wars, around 24 AD. This revolt, in which he allied with Tacfarinas, a Roman auxiliary soldier of Roman North Africa, who turned brigand, and who rose to be leader of the Musulamii, a tribe of nomadic Berber people living in Aures  during the Roman Empire. The revolt was the largest revolt against Roman rule in Algeria during the whole of the Roman occupation. .

Mazippas role in the revolt was said by Tacitus to have "ravaged the country and marked his way with fire and sword". The revolt was put down by Furius Camillus.

References

1st-century Berber people
Kingdom of Numidia